Chromat is an American fashion label based in New York City. The label was formed by Becca McCharen-Tran in 2010. Drawing from Becca McCharen-Tran's background in architecture and urban design, Chromat focuses on empowering garments for all bodies.

About

Chromat began in 2010 as an extension of McCharen-Tran's degree in architecture design at University of Virginia School of Architecture. It was originally a collaboration with fellow architecture student Emily Kappes. Chromat's structural language is the foundation of each garment: from the simplest bikini to the most complex 3D printed dress.

Chromat swimwear, lingerie, and signature architectural cages are all designed in New York City.

Press
Chromat designed custom pieces for Beyoncé's 2014 MTV VMA Performance,  the Mrs. Carter Show World Tour, as well as for Beyoncé's Super Bowl XLVII halftime show in 2013. Chromat garments have also been worn by Madonna on her 2012 MDNA World Tour, Nicki Minaj on her 2011 Femme Fatale World Tour and Powerhouse 2014 performance, and by many other celebrities and musicians such as FKA Twigs, Taylor Swift, Ellie Goulding, Kelly Rowland, Tyra Banks, Hayley Williams, Sky Ferreira, Zola Jesus, Azealia Banks, Ariana Grande Rita Ora, and Charli XCX.
Chromat has been featured in many magazine editorials and features, such as Vogue, Elle, DAZED, New York Magazine and Numéro.

Awards
 Chromat was awarded runner-up in the CFDA / Vogue Fashion Fund 2017.
Chromat was awarded the Tumblr Fashion Honors in 2016.
Chromat was a finalist in the CFDA / Vogue Fashion Fund 2015.
 McCharen was recognized in the Forbes 30 Under 30 list of “People Who are Reinventing the World in 2014”.
 McCharen was honored as one of Out Magazine's OUT100 in 2013.
 Chromat's work mixing math and fashion was profiled in The Wall Street Journal in 2013.
 Chromat was nominated for the RACKED Young Guns Award in 2013.
 McCharen was chosen as The New York Observer’s one to watch in 2012.

Collections
Autumn/Winter 2018: Wavvy. Debuted at New York Fashion Week on February 13, 2018.

Spring/Summer 2018: Serenity. Debuted at New York Fashion Week on September 4, 2017.

Autumn/Winter 2017: Buoyancy. Debuted at New York Fashion Week on February 13, 2017.

Spring/Summer 2017: Hyperwave. Debuted at New York Fashion Week on September 4, 2016.

Autumn/Winter 2016: Lumina. Debuted at New York Fashion Week on February 13, 2015.

Spring/Summer 2016: Momentum. Debuted at New York Fashion Week on September 4, 2016.

Autumn/Winter 2015: Mindfiles. Debuted at New York Fashion Week on February 13, 2015.

Spring/Summer 2015: Formula 15. Debuted at New York Fashion Week on September 4, 2014.

Autumn/Winter 2014: Bionic Bodies. Debuted at NYFW on February 6, 2014.

Spring/Summer 2014: Mathletes. Debuted at NYFW on September 6, 2013.

Autumn/Winter 2013: Superstructures. Debuted at NYFW on February 5, 2013.

References

External links
Chromat Official Website
Meet the CFDA Vogue Fashion Fund Finalists.

American fashion designers
Clothing companies established in 2010